The Edict of Pîtres was a capitulary promulgated at Pîtres on 25 June 864. It is often cited by historians as an example of successful government action on the part of Charles the Bald, king of West Francia. 

At the time Vikings more than annually ravaged not only the Frankish coastlands but, with the aid of Europe's numerous navigable rivers, much of the interior also. A king was most valued who could defeat them in the field and prevent their attacks in the future. The purpose and primary effect of the Edict was long thought to be the protection of the cities and countryside from Viking raids. 

Charles created a large force of cavalry upon which he could call as needed. He ordered all men who had horses or could afford horses to serve in the army as cavalrymen. This was one of the beginnings of the French chivalry so famous for the next seven centuries. The intention of Charles was to have a mobile force with which to descend upon the raiders before they could up and leave with their booty. 

To prevent the Vikings from even attaining a great booty, Charles also declared that fortified bridges should be built at all towns on rivers. This was to prevent the dreaded longships from sailing into the interior. Simon Coupland believes that only two bridges, at Pont-de-l'Arche (near Pîtres) on the Seine and at  Les Ponts-de-Cé on the Loire, were ever fortified, though a few others that had fallen into disrepair were rebuilt "in times of crisis in order to increase troop mobility".  Charles also prohibited all trade in weapons with the Vikings, in order to prevent them from establishing bases in Gaul. The penalty for selling horses to the Vikings was death. Since the prohibition on the sale of horses was new, it is probable that mounted Viking raids were on the rise. 

Aside from its auspicious military reforms, the Edict had political and economic consequences. King Pepin II of Aquitaine, against whom Charles had been fighting for decades, had been captured in 864 and was formally deposed at Pîtres. Economically, besides the prohibitions on commerce with the enemy, Charles tightened his control of the mints and regulated the punishment for counterfeiting. Prior to this edict at least nine places in France had the right of minting but these were reduced to three. Charles also made an attempt to control the building of private castles, but this failed and even minor lords constructed fortresses of their own on local hilltops to defend themselves and their peasants from the constant threat of Scandinavian invasion.

Editions and translations
Edition: "Edictum Pistense 864." A. Boretius and V. Krause, edd. MGH, Capitularia regum Francorum, 2. Hannover: 1897.
Translation: 
Translation: Coupland, Simon. Edict of Pîtres

References
Notes

Bibliography
Coupland, Simon. "The Fortified Bridges of Charles the Bald." Journal of Medieval History, 17(1991):1, 1–12. 
Gillmor, Carroll. "War on the Rivers: Viking Numbers and Mobility on the Seine and Loire, 841–886." Viator, 19(1988), 79–109. 
Munro, Dana Carleton. The Middle Ages, 395–1272. New York: The Century Company, 1921. 
Oman, Charles. The Dark Ages, 476–918. London: Rivingtons, 1914.

External links
http://www.fordham.edu/halsall/source/864charlesbald-pistes.asp
http://www.mgh.de/dmgh/resolving/MGH_Capit._2_S._310

864
9th century in West Francia
Law of France
Viking Age in France
Pistres
9th century in law